Yuri Vladimirovich Kuznetsov (born 2 August 1958) is a Russian professional football official and a former player. He works as an administrator with FC KAMAZ Naberezhnye Chelny.

External links
 

1958 births
People from Novotroitsk
Living people
Soviet footballers
Russian footballers
Association football forwards
FC KAMAZ Naberezhnye Chelny players
FC Rubin Kazan players
FC Neftekhimik Nizhnekamsk players
Russian Premier League players
FC Nosta Novotroitsk players
Sportspeople from Orenburg Oblast